The 1986 Camus Thailand Masters was a professional non-ranking snooker tournament held in August 1986 in Bangkok, Thailand.

16 year-old local favourite James Wattana an amateur invite won the tournament, defeating Terry Griffiths 2–1 in the final.

Main draw

References

Thailand Masters
Thailand Masters
Sport in Thailand
Thailand Masters